is a mountain located about  southwest of the center of Sapporo, Hokkaido and  southwest of Sapporo Station. A ropeway and a motorway pass through Mt. Moiwa, and an observatory and a ski resort in winter make it a resort for Sapporo citizens and tourists.

References

Mountains of Hokkaido
Mountains under 1000 metres